Heidi Widmer (born February 28, 1991 in Banff, Alberta) is a Canadian Olympic cross-country skier. In 2015, Widmer moved to Davos, Switzerland to race and train with the Swiss national team.

Cross-country skiing results
All results are sourced from the International Ski Federation (FIS).

Olympic Games

World Cup

Season standings

References

1991 births
Living people
Canadian female cross-country skiers
Cross-country skiers at the 2014 Winter Olympics
Olympic cross-country skiers of Canada
21st-century Canadian women